Biston is a genus of large, long-winged moths belonging to the family Geometridae. It is most notable for containing the well-known peppered moth. The genus was first described by William Elford Leach in 1815.

Distribution
The species of Biston are widely distributed in Holarctic, Oriental and Ethiopian regions.

Description
Palpi short and hairy. Thorax stout and clothed with thick pile. Legs hairy. Hind tibia not dilated and with slight spurs present. Forewings with rounded apex and oblique outer margin. Vein 3 from near angle of cell. Veins 7 to 9 stalked from near upper angle and veins 10, 11 stalked, where 10 often connected with veins 8 and 9. Hindwings with long cell and vein 3 from the angle.

Diversity
The genus currently contains 54 species and 40 subspecies.

Species
Species include:
 Biston achyra Wehrli, 1936
 Biston bengaliaria (Guenée, 1857)
 Biston betularia (Linnaeus, 1758) – peppered moth
 Biston brevipennata Inoue, 1982
 Biston bura (Warren, 1894)
 Biston contectaria (Walker, 1863)
 Biston exalbescens Inoue, 2000
 Biston falcata (Warren, 1893)
 Biston giganteus Inoue
 Biston hypoleucus Kuznetsov, 1901
 Biston inouei Holloway, 1993
 Biston insularis (Warren, 1894)
 Biston marginata Shiraki, 1913
 Biston mediolata Jiang, Nan, Dayong Xue & Hongxiang Han, 2011
 Biston melacron Wehrli, 1941
 Biston multidentata (Guedet, 1941)
 Biston panterinaria (Bremer & Grey, 1853)
 Biston pelidna Prout
 Biston perclara (Warren, 1899)
 Biston pustulata (Warren, 1896)
 Biston quercii (Oberthür, 1910)
 Biston regalis (Moore, 1888)
 Biston robustum Butler, 1879
 Biston strataria (Hufnagel, 1767) – oak beauty
 Biston subregalis Inoue
 Biston suppressaria (Guenée, 1857)
 Biston thibetaria (Oberthür, 1886)
 Biston thoracicarius (Oberthür, 1884)
 Biston tianschanicus Wehrli, 1940

References

 
Watson, L., and Dallwitz, M.J. 2003 onwards. British insects: the genera of Lepidoptera-Geometridae. Version: 29 December 2011  Full description
Caterpillar Hostplant Database
Nomina Insecta Nearctica
Fauna Europaea

Bistonini